Yannick Thermann (born 8 February 1994) is a German footballer who plays as a midfielder for SGV Freiberg.

References

External links
 
 

1994 births
Living people
Footballers from Hanover
German footballers
Germany youth international footballers
Association football midfielders
TSG 1899 Hoffenheim II players
Stuttgarter Kickers players
SG Sonnenhof Großaspach players
SGV Freiberg players
Regionalliga players
3. Liga players